The Cardinet Candy Company was a maker of confections in Oakland, California.  Its most famous product was the U-No Bar.

The company was founded in  1909 by  Emile H. Cardinet to produce his invention, the U-No Bar.

In 1978, the company was acquired by the Annabelle Candy Company located in Hayward, California.

References

External links
 Obituary of George Cardinet Jr.
 "Death of a U-No Bar", Hogsalt

Confectionery companies based in California
Food and drink companies disestablished in 1978
Defunct food and drink companies of the United States
Food and drink companies established in the 1920s
1920s establishments in California
Manufacturing companies based in Oakland, California